Attention Please is the second studio album by American experimental big band project Ether Bunny, released on December 28, 2017 by Rodentia Productions. Its working title was Toybox.

Track listing

Personnel
Adapted from the Music for Player Piano liner notes.

Ether Bunny
 Daniel Vahnke – sampler, musical arrangements

Production
 Neil Wojewodzki – mastering, mixing, editing

Release history

References

External links 
 Attention Please at Discogs (list of releases)
 Attention Please at Bandcamp

2017 albums
Ether Bunny albums
Instrumental albums
Sound collage albums